Voivodeship road 108 (abbreviated DW 108) is a route in the Polish voivodeship roads network. The route runs through two powiats: Kamień County(Gmina Wolin and Gmina Golczewo and Gryfice County (Gmina Płoty).

Important settlements along the route

Parłówko
Strzegowo
Wysoka Kamieńska
Baczysław
Kretlewo
Gadom
Golczewo
Unibórz
Truskolas
Płoty

Route plan

References

108